Monica Cafferky is a British freelance journalist who has written for a number of publications including the Daily Mirror, Daily Mail, The Sun, Daily Express, The Guardian, News of the World, Star on Sunday, The Scotsman and Woman's Own.

Career
Cafferky's first job was on a martial arts magazine followed by a two-year stint as a staff writer on Woman's Own. She went freelance in 2002, and had a weekly Mind, Body, Spirit page in "The Daily Mirror", which ran for three years.

Cafferky writes lifestyle articles for a number of publications.

Since 2014, she has been a Visiting Lecturer at The University of Huddersfield on the BA (Hons) Journalism course.

Books
Cafferky's Debut novel The Winter's Sleep will be released in October 2019. Her social media accounts describe this as a spookily compelling tale of betrayal, fraud and ghosts.

Cafferky has co-authored three self-help books, which are published by Piatkus/Little Brown. The second book The Future Is Yours is an international best seller. All three books have been translated into several languages including: Japanese, Norwegian, Czech, Portuguese, Bulgarian, Slovak and Estonian. Instant Intuition (Piatkus, 2007) The Future is Yours (Piatkus, 2007) Cosmic Energy (Little Brown, 2009).

References

External links
 Huffington Post biography
 United Agents biography
 Monica Cafferky

British journalists
Living people
Year of birth missing (living people)
Place of birth missing (living people)